Burgas is a city in Bulgaria that is the major city for the Burgas Province.
Related are :
 Gulf of Burgas, a Gulf in the Black Sea
 Burgas Lakes, a group of coastal lakes of varying saltiness located around the Bulgarian city of Burgas
 Lake Burgas, a natural lake in Bulgaria
 Burgas Peninsula, a peninsula of Livingston Island in Antarctica
 Burgas Airport, a Bulgarian Airport
 Spirit of Burgas, a summer music festival.
 PFC Burgas, a Bulgarian association football club based in Burgas.

Burgas, Burgaz or Bourgas may elsewhere refer to :
 Burgazada, an island in the Sea of Marmara, near Istanbul.
 Burgazada Synagogue, a Synagogue in Istanbul
 A town in Turkey near the former Ancient city and bishopric of Bria, in Phrygia
 As Burgas, hot springs in Ourense, Spain
 Lüleburgaz, a town in European Turkey (Thrace).
 The central neighborhood of Güzelyalı, Bursa